Neville Fraser (28 September 1930 – 17 May 2010) was an Australian cricketer. He played in two first-class matches for Queensland in 1950/51.

See also
 List of Queensland first-class cricketers

References

External links
 

1930 births
2010 deaths
Australian cricketers
Queensland cricketers
Cricketers from Queensland